Bernard Rimland (November 15, 1928 – November 21, 2006) was an American research psychologist, writer, lecturer, and influential person in the field of developmental disorders. Rimland's first book, Infantile Autism, sparked by the birth of a son who had autism, was instrumental in changing attitudes toward the disorder. Rimland founded and directed two advocacy groups: the Autism Society of America (ASA) and the Autism Research Institute. He promoted several since disproven theories about the causes and treatment of autism, including vaccine denial, facilitated communication, chelation therapy, and false claims of a link between secretin and autism. He also supported the ethically controversial practice of using aversives on autistic children.

Education
Rimland completed his undergraduate studies and earned a master's degree in psychology at San Diego State University. He obtained his Ph.D. in experimental psychology and research design, from Pennsylvania State University in 1953.

Career
Upon completion of his doctorate, Rimland and his wife moved back to San Diego. Rimland worked as a psychologist at the Point Loma Naval Station, where he remained until 1985.

After the birth of his son, Mark, and his subsequent diagnosis of autism around the age of 2, Rimland began researching the disorder. The prevailing theory in the 1950s was that autism was the reaction of children to mothers who were "cold and distant". Rimland's personal experience contradicted this idea of "refrigerator mothers" and he began searching for alternative explanations.

In 1964, Rimland published his book, Infantile Autism: The Syndrome and Its Implications for a Neural Theory of Behavior. In the book, Rimland asserted that autism was not a psychological manifestation caused by unfeeling parents, a widely held belief popularized by Bruno Bettelheim. Instead, Rimland suggested, autism was a result of biochemical defects "triggered by environmental assaults". He acknowledged that there may also be a genetic component predisposing children to the disorder. Rimland argued that autism could "be treated—or at least ameliorated—with biomedical and behavioral therapies." Infantile Autism challenged the medical establishment's perceptions of autism. Rimland's message resonated with parents and, after the book was published, he began getting calls and letters from people who wanted to share their stories and ask for advice.

In 1965, Rimland founded the Autism Society of America (ASA), a parent advocacy organization, to "work on behalf of autistic children and their families at local, state and national levels."

In 1967, Rimland left the ASA to establish the Autism Research Institute (ARI), a San Diego-based non-profit organization dedicated to researching and collecting data on autism and related disorders. He kept a database of research and case histories, as well as conducted and sponsored research in an attempt identify the cause of autism and offer effective treatment solutions. Rimland supported Applied Behavioral Analysis (ABA), a systematic educational approach made popular by Ivar Lovaas. He published an ARI newsletter, which reached an international audience.

Rimland was also the editor of the Autism Research Review International, published by ARI, which covers biomedical and educational advances in autism research.

In 1988, Rimland served as technical advisor on autism for the 1988 movie Rain Man. Rimland suggested giving Raymond Babbitt, the movie's main character portrayed by Dustin Hoffman, the extraordinary characteristics of someone with Savant syndrome. Hoffman interviewed Rimland's son, Mark, in preparing for the role. He felt the movie portrayed people with disabilities, and particularly autism, sympathetically. The makers of the movie made a donation of $75,000, intended to go to Rimland's Autism Research Institute. However, the check was made out to the Autism Society of America in error. Rimland sued to get the money returned, but lost in court because he failed to file the lawsuit in time.

Defeat Autism Now! (DAN!), established in 1995, brought together parents, clinicians, and researchers to "explore and establish effective biomedical interventions.

Stance on key issues
Rimland was outspoken on what he believed to be the major causes for autism: environmental pollutants, antibiotics, and vaccinations. Sometimes, this put him at odds with the established medical community. In a letter to the editor of the Washington Post in 1997, Rimland wrote: "The reason that the public–and Congress–supports alternative medicine is that conventional medicine, despite its arrogance, is far too ineffective, far too harmful and far too costly. Non-conventional medicine is a rational alternative to a much greater evil–conventional medicine."

Vaccinations
Rimland considered vaccinations to be a "prime suspect" in the onset of autism. He maintained that, while not proven, there was a direct link between thiomersal (a mercury-based preservative used in vaccines) and autism. He supported Andrew Wakefield's now discredited suggestion that the MMR vaccine was linked to autism. Rimland contended that the vaccination triggered autism by placing a burden on the immune systems of children between birth and age 2.

Rimland linked the increase of late-onset autism during the 1980s with the introduction of the MMR vaccine, a correlation the Center for Disease Control, the American Academy of Pediatrics, and the American Medical Association did not support. He rejected the idea that a diagnosis of autism at or around 18 months, the same time the vaccinations were administered, was coincidental. When the California Department of Health Services, along with studies from England and Finland, reported that the vaccine "plays little or no role in the disease," Rimland stated that it was "much too early to dismiss the [vaccine] hypothesis". He remained undeterred when a study by Robert L. Davis, published in the Archives of Pediatrics and Adolescent Medicine, found no association between MMR and inflammatory bowel disease, discussed in the Wakefield report, "nor any evidence that the vaccine triggered acute onset of symptoms." In 2004, 10 of the 13 co-authors of the Wakefield study withdrew the original interpretation. The United States Institute of Medicine (IOM) in its 2004 report found that, "the body of epidemiological evidence favors rejection of a causal relationship between thimerosal-containing vaccines and autism."

The Medicines and Healthcare products Regulatory Agency (MHRA), National Health Service (NHS), World Health Organization (WHO), European Medicines Agency (EMEA), Food and Drug Administration (FDA), Centers for Disease Control (CDC), and many other national and international medical organizations have issued statements of a similar nature, finding no link between autism and thimerosal based on the evidence currently available from a variety of studies.

Chelation

Rimland supported chelation therapy, a treatment for lead and heavy metal poisoning, for some children with autism. Neither the American Academy of Pediatrics nor FDA support the use of chelation for the treatment of autism.

Diet therapy and secretin
Rimland supported research that focused on "natural, non-toxic ways" to address symptoms of autism. He believed that vitamins (specifically B-6 and magnesium) and minerals could help change body chemistry and bring about behavioral changes.

Rimland advocated the use of secretin, a "naturally occurring intestinal hormone, saying it was "possibly the most important discovery in the history of autism. He claimed that children treated with the hormone showed "sudden and dramatic improvement". However, researchers in North Carolina and the University of Chicago in separate studies showed that the children receiving treatments with secretin showed "no more improvement" than those receiving a placebo. This treatment was not recommended by the National Institute of Child Health and Human Development.

Facilitated communication
Rimland was an early supporter of facilitated communication (FC) (now discredited), though he disputed founder Douglas Biklen's claims that autism was "fundamentally a motor problem". At first, Rimland claimed the technique was effective for "a small number of people", but far fewer than the 100% success rate claimed by some proponents. He advocated "properly conducted research" to determine whether correct answers could be obtained if the facilitator did not know the answers.

As FC generated false claims of abuse (about 25 by his count in 1993), mostly against parents, Rimland's view of FC's usefulness changed to one of caution. "In almost every instance of this sort, when charges have come to court and been investigated, courts have decided that they were untrue." Rimland later said, "How is it possible that an autistic kid can pick up the last tiny crumbs of potato chips off a plate but not have sufficient motor coordination to type the letter E?"

Rimland became a "vigorous critic" of FC after "more than two dozen 'blind' trials, showed the people with autism being facilitated "typed the names of objects that only the facilitators had been shown." In 1995, Rimland reported that peer-reviewed studies (40+) with more than 400 people with autism as subjects had "failed to document FC in all but a handful of cases." As a result, in 1994, the American Psychological Association, the American Academy of Child and Adolescent Psychiatry and the American Speech–Language–Hearing Association noted in their position statements that "there is no scientific proof that communication via a facilitator is valid."

Aversives 
Rimland was in favor of aversives, and testified against the Hughes Act, which restricted their use. At least once, he misrepresented the views of his colleagues to make it seem as though they supported aversive when they did not so as to further his viewpoint. After Rimland quoted Anne Donnellan and another anti-aversive behaviorists as being in support of the practice, Donnellan issued the following response: "We never have made or written such a statement. Dr. Rimland has been warned publicly and privately that to continue to use our names and our professional reputations to support positions that he espouses and we oppose exposes him to charges of unethical, illegal, as well as ridiculous conduct."

Personal life
Rimland was born on November 15, 1928, in Cleveland, Ohio. He and his family moved to San Diego, California, in 1940.

In 1951, Rimland married Gloria Belle Alf. They had three children. Mark, born in 1956, exhibited challenging behaviors which Rimland self-diagnosed through research as autism. This condition, relatively unknown at the time, was confirmed by a pediatrician.

Death
At the age of 78, Rimland died of prostate cancer on November 21, 2006, at a care facility in El Cajon, California.

Books
1964 Infantile Autism: The Syndrome and Its Implication for a Neural Theory of Behavior - written after his son, Mark, was diagnosed as autism.
1976 Modern Therapies (with Virginia Binder, A. Binder)
1998 Biological Treatments for Autism and PDD (with William Shaw, Lisa Lewis, Bruce Semon)
2001 Tired - so Tired!: And the "Yeast Connection" (with William Crook, Cynthia Crook) 
2003 Vaccines, Autism and Childhood Disorders: Crucial Data That Could Save Your Child's Life (with Neil Z. Miller)
2003 Treating Autism: Parent Stories of Hope and Success (with Stephen M. Edelson, Ph.D.)
2006 Recovering Autistic Children (originally published as Treating Autism) Second Edition (with Stephen M. Edelson, Ph.D.)

References

1928 births
2006 deaths
Activists from Ohio
20th-century American educators
American health activists
American male non-fiction writers
American medical writers
20th-century American psychologists
Autism activists
Autism researchers
Deaths from cancer in California
Deaths from prostate cancer
Jewish American writers
Jews and Judaism in Cleveland
Pennsylvania State University alumni
Writers from Cleveland
San Diego State University alumni
Writers from San Diego
Activists from California
20th-century American male writers
20th-century American Jews
21st-century American Jews